Gradski stadion (Cyrillic: Градски стадион, "City Stadium") is a multi-use stadium in Orašje, Bosnia and Herzegovina.  It is currently used mostly for football matches and is the home ground of HNK Orašje.  The stadium holds 3,000.

References 

Football venues in Bosnia and Herzegovina
Orašje